Jonathan Marray and Aisam-ul-Haq Qureshi were the defending champions, but Qureshi chose to compete in Hamburg instead. Marray played alongside Adil Shamasdin, but lost in the final to Sam Groth and Chris Guccione, 4–6, 3–6.

Seeds

Draw

Draw

References 
 Draw

2016 Hall of Fame Tennis Championships